Came the Dawn is a 1949 thriller novel by the British writer and journalist Paul Winterton under the pseudonym of Roger Bax. Set in the Soviet Union it drew on Winterton's experience as Moscow correspondent for the News Chronicle and BBC. It was published in the United States by Harper under the alternative title Two If by Sea.

Film adaptation
In 1953 it was adapted into the film Never Let Me Go, produced by the British subsidiary of MGM. Directed by Delmer Daves and starring Clark Gable, Gene Tierney and Bernard Miles.

References

Bibliography
 Goble, Alan. The Complete Index to Literary Sources in Film. Walter de Gruyter, 1999.
 Reilly, John M. Twentieth Century Crime & Mystery Writers. Springer, 2015.

1949 British novels
British thriller novels
Novels set in the Soviet Union
British novels adapted into films
Hutchinson (publisher) books